630 Euphemia is a mid-sized Eunomian asteroid.

Photometric observations at the Palmer Divide Observatory
during 2005 showed a best fit rotation period of 79.18 ± 0.02 hours with a brightness
variation of 0.2 ± 0.02 in magnitude. However, some uncertainty remains concerning the reliability of this result.

References

External links 
 Lightcurve plot of 630 Euphemia, Palmer Divide Observatory, B. D. Warner (2005)
 Asteroid Lightcurve Database (LCDB), query form (info )
 Dictionary of Minor Planet Names, Google books
 Asteroids and comets rotation curves, CdR – Observatoire de Genève, Raoul Behrend
 Discovery Circumstances: Numbered Minor Planets (1)-(5000) – Minor Planet Center
 
 

Eunomia asteroids
Euphemia
Euphemia
Slow rotating minor planets
S-type asteroids
19070307